Äppelbo is a locality situated in Vansbro Municipality, Dalarna County, Sweden with 258 inhabitants in 2010.

References

External links

Populated places in Dalarna County
Populated places in Vansbro Municipality